A barricade is an object used to control, block passage, or force the flow of traffic in the desired direction.

Barricade or barricades may also refer to:

Arts and entertainment

Films
The Barricade, a 1921 American silent film directed by Christy Cabanne
Barricade (1939 film), an action film directed by Gregory Ratoff and starring Alice Faye
Barricade (1950 film), a western film starring Dane Clark, Raymond Massey, and Ruth Roman
Barricade (2007 film), a horror film directed by Timo Rose
Barricade (2012 film), a thriller film directed by Andrew Currie
Barricades (film), a 1972 documentary film by Ram Loevy

Fictional characters
Barricade (C.O.P.S.), a fictional character in the COPS universe
Barricade (Transformers), several fictional robot super villain characters in the Transformers robot superhero franchise.
Barricade (G.I. Joe), a fictional character in the G.I. Joe universe

Other
Barricade (play), a 1975 Bengali drama written and directed by Utpal Dutt
Barricade (video game), an overhead view maze arcade game released by RamTeK in 1976
"Barricade" (song), a 2010 song by Interpol
Barricade, a board game also known as Malefiz, popular in German speaking countries

In the military
Operation Barricade, a British commando raid during the Second World War
USS Barricade (ACM-3), a Chimo-class minelayer in the United States Navy during World War II
HMAS Barricade (P 98), an Attack class patrol boat of the Royal Australian Navy

Other uses
The Barricades, events that took place between 13 and 27 January 1991 in Latvia
"Barrycades", a derogatory term for the United States federal government shutdown of 2013
An emergency system of arresting gear for aircraft.
Barricade gel, a fire-retardant gel that is mostly made of hydrogel